Sana Javed (born 27 March 1983) is a Pakistani former cricketer who played as a wicket-keeper and right-handed batter. She appeared in 20 One Day Internationals for Pakistan between 2005 and 2008, including captaining the side at the 2005–06 Women's Asia Cup. She played domestic cricket for Lahore.

References

External links
 
 

1983 births
Living people
Cricketers from Punjab, Pakistan
Pakistani women cricketers
Pakistan women One Day International cricketers
Pakistani women cricket captains
Lahore women cricketers